Harley Finkelstein is a Canadian businessperson, entrepreneur and public speaker. He is best known as the president of Shopify. He is a board member of CBC, and an advisor to both OMERS Ventures and Felicis Ventures. He is also a Dragon on CBC Dragons' Den, Next Gen Den.

Early life and education
Finkelstein was born in Montreal, Quebec, Canada. At 17, he founded a T-shirt company while attending McGill University. He later transferred to Concordia University and received a bachelor's degree in economics. Finkelstein then attended the University of Ottawa where he founded the JD/MBA Student Society and the Canadian MBA Oath while working towards his Juris Doctor and MBA.

Career
After completing his JD and MBA, Finkelstein worked at a law firm in Toronto for a year. In 2009, Finkelstein met with Tobias Lütke, the co-founder and CEO of Shopify, to discuss opportunities for the company, and became one of the first merchants on Shopify.  Finkelstein was hired soon after and was named Shopify's Chief Platform Officer. In December 2014, Finkelstein was appointed a member of the C100 board. The C100 is an organization that supports the Canadian technology community and is a bridge between Canada and Silicon Valley. Finkelstein serves as a mentor and advisor to various organizations and incubators including Felicis Ventures, FounderFuel, Invest Ottawa and CIPPIC.

In January 2016, Finkelstein was named COO of Shopify. That same year, he was inducted into the Order of Ottawa by Mayor Jim Watson.

In December 2017, Finkelstein joined the board of directors for CBC.

In September 2020, Finkelstein was appointed Shopify President.

Awards 
Finkelstein was named Angel investor of the Year at the Canadian Startup Awards in March 2017.

In 2017 Finkelstein was awarded Canada’s Top 40 Under 40.

Personal life and philanthropy 
Finkelstein is Jewish and is the grandson of Holocaust survivors. He is married to Lindsay Taub, who is also Jewish, and they have two daughters. The four of them live in New Edinburgh. In 2018 it was announced that Finkelstein was donating $500,000 to establish the new Finkelstein Chabad Jewish Centre in the Sandy Hill neighbourhood of Ottawa. After attending the Chabad centre when he was a student at the University of Ottawa and realizing that there was not enough room to fit all the students who wished to attend events, he promised the Rabbi he would donate to pay him back for the generosity of his family in welcoming Jewish students in Ottawa.

Finkelstein has spoken about, and uses the concept of Ikigai.

References

External links
Harley Finkelstein for The Globe and Mail

Businesspeople from Montreal
Businesspeople from Ottawa
Canadian Jews
Concordia University alumni
Living people
Chief operating officers
Year of birth missing (living people)